The Circus Queen Murder is a 1933 American pre-Code mystery film directed by Roy William Neill and starring Adolphe Menjou, Donald Cook and Greta Nissen. It is the sequel to the 1932 film The Night Club Lady in which Menjou had also starred as Thatcher Colt.  The film is based on a story by "Anthony Abbott", a pseudonym used by Fulton Oursler.

Plot
New York Police Commissioner Thatcher Colt (Adolphe Menjou) decides to take a vacation after six years of fighting crime, accompanied by his attractive secretary, Miss Kelly (Ruthelma Stevens). On the train to their destination, they spot a rundown circus, "The Greater John T Rainey Shows", heading to the same place. The circus is home to a love triangle: Josie La Tour (Greta Nissen), her husband Flandrin  (Dwight Frye) (whom she is intent on divorcing), and her lover The Great Sebastian (Donald Cook (actor)), all three trapeze performers.

Jim Dugan (Harry Holman), the circus's press agent, recognizes his old friend Colt as the circus parades through town and gives him and Kelly free passes. Josie La Tour's horse is spooked and runs away with her; La Tour escapes unharmed.

Dugan takes a reluctant Colt to see Rainey (George Rosener) that night. Rainey tells him that someone is out to destroy his show; each of the principal performers received an anonymous note telling them not to perform tomorrow - Friday the 13th - or they will die. He also cites La Tour's near accident. Colt, however, suspects that it is all a publicity stunt concocted by Dugan. Kelly reveals that the runaway horse was engineered by Flandrin popping a balloon; she also was able to lipread what Flandrin said to his wife just before: "You double-crossing cheat. I'll kill the both of you." Rainey also informs Colt that La Tour, the star attraction, owns half the circus. When they go to see Flandrin, they find a note saying that he is the "first to go", a bullet hole in the window of his wagon and blood on his cot. However, there is no body, which arouses Colt's suspicions. Then La Tour's beloved dog is found with its throat cut. As Colt is questioning La Tour, someone throws a voodoo doll through her window.

The next day, Kelly reports that the blood is not human. Colt surmises that it is dog's blood, and he noticed an extra member of the "cannibal" troupe last night, Flandrin in disguise. Colt searches the circus for the madman. He advises Rainey to cancel the performance, but La Tour insists on going on with the show.

Outside, unnoticed, Flandrin climbs to the top of the Big Top tent. Sebastian is nearly killed when one of trapeze ropes gives way, partially cut by Flandrin, but he escapes unscathed. The audience believes it is all part of his act. Then La Tour performs, also on the trapeze. Flandrin shoots her with a poison dart using a blowgun. She falls to the ground and dies. Afterward, when Colt roams the grounds, he encounters Flandrin, armed with a pistol and holding Kelly captive. He orders Colt to see to it that Sebastian is alone in the tent with La Tour's body. When he sees people leave the tent, he ventures inside with Kelly, then shoots Sebastian in the back. It is actually Colt in disguise and wearing bulletproof clothing (borrowed from the circus). Flandrin races into the Big Top to put on his last performance, high in the air. At the end, he shoots himself.

Cast
 Adolphe Menjou as Thatcher Colt  
 Ruthelma Stevens as Miss Kelly 
 Greta Nissen as Josie La Tour   
 Donald Cook as The Great Sebastian  
 Dwight Frye as Flandrin  
 Harry Holman as Jim Dugan  
 George Rosener as John T. Rainey 
 Helene Chadwick as Crying Woman 
 Eddy Chandler as Roustabout 
 Clay Clement as Lubbell  
 Bud Geary as Roustabout  
 Frank Mills as Circus Man at Washtub  
 Lee Phelps as Reporter

References

Bibliography
 Backer, Ron. Mystery Movie Series of 1930s Hollywood. McFarland, 2012.

External links
 

1933 films
1933 mystery films
Adultery in films
American black-and-white films
American mystery films
American sequel films
Circus films
Columbia Pictures films
Films directed by Roy William Neill
Films set in New York (state) 
1930s English-language films
1930s American films